Yaima Rosario Mena Pena (born 28 January 1985) is a female diver from Cuba.

She competed at the 2015 World Aquatics Championships  in the women's synchronized 10 metre platform.

See also
 Cuba at the 2015 World Aquatics Championships

References

External links
Yaima Mena at Sports Reference
http://results.toronto2015.org/IRS/en/diving/athlete-profile-n10146330-mena-yaima.htm
http://archives.fina.org/H2O/index.php?option=com_content&view=article&id=1372:fina-dgp-2010-montreal-can&catid=353:results-archives&Itemid=1301
http://www.alamy.com/stock-photo-cubas-yaima-mena-and-annia-rivera-compete-in-the-womens-synchronized-118837815.html
http://www.gettyimages.com/photos/yaima-mena?excludenudity=true&sort=mostpopular&mediatype=photography&phrase=yaima%20mena&family=editorial

Cuban female divers
Living people
Place of birth missing (living people)
1985 births
Divers at the 2004 Summer Olympics
Olympic divers of Cuba
Divers at the 2011 Pan American Games
Pan American Games medalists in diving
Pan American Games bronze medalists for Cuba
Medalists at the 2011 Pan American Games